Uranus is a planet in the Solar System.

Uranus may also refer to:
Uranus (mythology), an ancient Greek sky god

Fiction
 Uranus (novel), a 1948 novel by Marcel Aymé
Uranus, a character in Duckman
Uranus, a character in Bloody Roar
Uranus, a character in Battle Arena Toshinden
Uranus Corporation, a fictional corporation in The Groove Tube

Music
 "Uranus, the Magician", a movement in Gustav Holst's The Planets
Uranus (EP), a 1993 EP by Shellac

Other uses
Uranus (astrology), the astrological aspects of Uranus
Uranus (film), a 1990 film starring Gérard Depardieu
German trawler Uranus, a vorpostenboot briefly in service in 1940
Club Uranus, an event at The EndUp
Operation Uranus, a Soviet World War II offensive to win the Battle of Stalingrad
Uranus Hill or Dealul Spirii, a hill in Bucharest, Romania
Uranus, Missouri, an unincorporated small town and tourist attraction along the former U.S. Route 66 in Missouri

People with the surname
Nicephorus Uranus or Nikephoros Ouranos, Byzantine strategos of Antiocheia from 999 to c. 1010

See also

 Sailor Uranus or Haruka Tenoh, a character in Sailor Moon 
 Urania (disambiguation)
 Uranium, a chemical element
 Uranium (disambiguation)